The Baldwin VO-1000  is a diesel-electric switcher locomotive built by the Baldwin Locomotive Works between January 1939 and December 1946. These were either the AAR Type-A switcher trucks, or the Batz truck originally developed by the Atchison, Topeka and Santa Fe Railway as a leading truck for steam locomotives.  548 examples of this model were built for American railroads, including examples for the Army and Navy.

Between June and August 1945 Baldwin supplied 30 Co-Co road locomotives with 8-cylinder VO engines for export to the Soviet Union as their Дб20 (Db20) class.

There are at least eight intact examples of the VO-1000 that are known to survive today, most of which are owned by museums or historical societies. However, a VO-1000m is owned by the Northwestern Pacific Railroad, a local freight carrier based in Schellville, California.

Conversions

In the early 1960s the Reading Company sent 14 of their VO-1000s to General Motors Electro-Motive Division to have them rebuilt to SW900 specifications.  These locomotives retained most of their original carbodies, and were subsequently given the designation VO-1000m.

Around the same time, the Elgin, Joliet and Eastern Railway repowered its VO1000s with turbocharged 606SC Baldwin engines taken from its EMD-repowered fleet of Baldwin DT-6-6-2000 locomotives. The work was performed at EJ&E's Joliet, Illinois workshops, and produced a finished unit that featured an offset exhaust stack and left-side turbocharger bulge, the latter being much like that found on Baldwin road switchers. The Atlantic Coast Line Railroad had eight of their VO1000s repowered with EMD 567 series engines, which produced . The Great Northern Railway converted four VO-1000s into transfer cabooses in 1964. The units were stripped to their bare frames (the original trucks and distinctive cast steps were left in place) and fitted with -long steel cabins.

The St. Louis – San Francisco Railway repowered theirs with EMD 567C prime movers in the late 50's and early 60's. The conversion lead to extended use into the late 70's. Most units were retired in 1979, though some were sold off.

In December 1970 the Atchison, Topeka and Santa Fe Railway (soon after its successful CF7 capital rebuilding program) produced a unique switcher locomotive, known to railfans as the "Beep", at its Cleburne, Texas service facility. The company hoped to determine whether or not remanufacturing its aging, non-EMD end cab switchers by fitting them with new EMD prime movers was economically prudent. The conversion proved too costly, and only the one unit was modified.

Original owners

Preserved examples

 B&O #412 is operational in Bridgeport, NJ. (ex-USN #19)
 BOMX #32 is preserved at the B&O Railroad Museum in Baltimore, MD. (ex-Canton Railroad Company #32, exx-Patapsco and Back Rivers Railroad #331)
 Colorado and Wyoming Railway #1107 is preserved at the Museum of the American Railroad in Dallas, TX.
 NC&StL #36 is preserved at the Tennessee Valley Railroad Museum in Chattanooga, TN. However this engine never served "The Dixie Line", this one served the United States Navy
 NKP #99 is preserved at the Indiana Transportation Museum in Noblesville, IN. (ex-USN #9) According to unconfirmed reports this locomotive was to be sold to the city of Kokomo, Indiana for static display but the deal was never finalized. 
 NNRM #801 is being restored in Ely, NV.
 OERM #8 is preserved at the Orange Empire Railway Museum in Perris, CA.
 WMRY #132 is preserved at the Hagerstown Roundhouse Museum in Hagerstown, MD.
 BLW #1200 is preserved at the Railroad Museum of Pennsylvania  in Strasburg, PA.
SLSF 200 (repowered with an EMD 567C engine and equipped with an EMD SW1200 hood) is preserved at the Tennessee Valley Railroad Museum in Chattanooga.

References

External links

B-B locomotives
VO-1000
Diesel-electric locomotives of the United States
Railway locomotives introduced in 1939
Standard gauge locomotives of the United States
Shunting locomotives